Bovenkarspel Flora is a railway station on the outskirts of Bovenkarspel, Netherlands. The station opened in 1977 and is located between Hoorn and Enkhuizen. The station is on the Zaandam–Enkhuizen railway. The station and services are operated by the Nederlandse Spoorwegen. The station was originally opened to serve visitors to the annual "Westfriese Flora" flower fair held there, which is why Flora is included in the name. In 1999 an outbreak of legionellosis occurred during the flower fair which caused at least 32 deaths. The fair was renamed the "Holland Flower Festival" in 2003 and was relocated to Zwaagdijk-Oost in 2005.

Train services
The following services currently call at Bovenkarspel Flora:
2 per hour intercity service Enkhuizen–Hoorn–Amsterdam–Hilversum–Amersfoort (–Deventer)
2 per hour intercity service Enkhuizen–Hoorn–Amsterdam (peak hours)

External links
NS website 
Dutch public transport travel planner 

Railway stations in North Holland
Railway stations opened in 1977